Water Lilies (or Nymphéas) is a series of approximately 250 oil paintings by French Impressionist Claude Monet (1840–1926). The paintings depict his flower garden at his home in Giverny, and were the main focus of his artistic production during the last thirty years of his life. Many of the works were painted while Monet suffered from cataracts.

Background
Monet's long-standing preference for producing and exhibiting a series of paintings related by subject and perspective began in 1889, with at least ten paintings done at the Valley of the Creuse, which were shown at the Galerie Georges Petit.  Among his other famous series are his Haystacks.

During the 1920s, the state of France built a pair of oval rooms at the Musée de l'Orangerie as a permanent home for eight water lily murals by Monet. The exhibit opened to the public on 16 May 1927, a few months after Monet's death. Sixty water lily paintings from around the globe were assembled for a special exhibition at the Musée de l'Orangerie in 1999.

The paintings are on prominent display at museums all over the world, including the Princeton University Art Museum, Musée Marmottan Monet, the Musée d'Orsay in Paris, the Metropolitan Museum of Art, Museum of Modern Art in New York, the Art Institute of Chicago, the Saint Louis Art Museum, the Nelson-Atkins Museum of Art in Kansas City, Missouri, the Carnegie Museum of Art, the National Museum of Wales, the Musée des Beaux-Arts de Nantes, The Toledo Museum of Art, the Cleveland Museum of Art, the Portland Art Museum, and the Legion of Honor. In 2020, the Museum of Fine Arts, Boston celebrated its 150th anniversary with some of Monet's Water Lilies paintings.

The paintings at auction

On 19 June 2007, one of Monet's Water Lily paintings sold for £18.5 million at a Sotheby's auction in London. On 24 June 2008 another of his Water Lily paintings, Le Bassin Aux Nymphéas, sold for almost £41 million at Christie's in London, almost double the estimate of £18 to £24 million.

In May 2010, it was announced that the 1906 Nymphéas work would be auctioned in London in June 2010. The painting had an estimated sale price of between £30 and £40 million. Giovanna Bertazzoni, Christie's auction house director and head of impressionist and modern art, said, "Claude Monet's water-lily paintings are amongst the most recognised and celebrated works of the 20th Century and were hugely influential to many of the following generations of artists." The sale took place on 23 June 2010 at the auction house and the painting attracted bids of up to £29 million, but it ultimately failed to sell.

On 6 May 2014, one of the Water Lilies, Le Bassin aux Nymphéas, was auctioned at Christie's, New York City for $27 million.[16]

In June 2014, one of the Water Lilies, Nymphéas, sold for $54 million USD at a Sotheby's auction in London. This piece was auctioned to an anonymous buyer, but the piece went on to be part of the exhibition "Painting the Modern Garden: From Monet to Matisse" at the Cleveland Museum of Art and the Royal Academy of Arts, London, starting in 2015. The co-chairman of Sotheby's modern and impressionist art department, Helena Newman, claims that the result is at the top of the original estimated selling price. This price was between 34 and 51 million USD.

While many of Monet’s masterpieces have sold, there are still an estimated 250 oil paintings from this series. The collection is widely popular, with many of these pieces residing in exhibits that have yet to go to auction. The paintings have been catalogued by Daniel Wildenstein in his Monet: Catalogue Raisonné.

Gallery

List of Water Lily paintings

See also
List of paintings by Claude Monet
Weeping Willow, 1918 Monet painting, one of several works depicting a Weeping Willow tree located at the edge of his Water Lilies pond

Notes

External links

 Claude Monet, Ministère de la culture et de la communication
 Claude Monet, Joconde, Portail des collections des musées de France
 Water Lilies at the Portland Art Museum
 Monet's Years at Giverny: Beyond Impressionism, exhibition catalog fully online as PDF from The Metropolitan Museum of Art, which contains material on these works

Series of paintings by Claude Monet
Paintings by Claude Monet
Paintings in the collection of the Art Institute of Chicago
Paintings in the collection of the Metropolitan Museum of Art
Paintings in the collection of the Museum of Modern Art (New York City)
Paintings in the collection of the Galleria Nazionale d'Arte Moderna
1890s paintings
1900s paintings
1910s paintings
1920s paintings
Water in art
Paintings in the collection of the Musée de l'Orangerie
Collection of the Los Angeles County Museum of Art
Paintings in the collection of the Musée Marmottan Monet
Bridges in art